Daphnella patula is a species of sea snail, a marine gastropod mollusk in the family Raphitomidae.

Description
This species has a shorter spire than Daphnella lymneiformis. It has a low beaded keel just below the suture but it persists through the adult stage.

Distribution
This marine species occurs off the Philippines.

References

 Reeve, L.A. 1845. Monograph of the genus Pleurotoma. pls 20-33 in Reeve, L.A. (ed). Conchologia Iconica. London : L. Reeve & Co. Vol. 1.
 Powell, A. W. B., 1966. The molluscan families Speightiidae and Turridae, an evaluation of the valid taxa, both Recent and fossil, with list of characteristic species. Bulletin of the Auckland Institute and Museum, 5:1-184123.

External links
 

patula
Gastropods described in 1845